This list of cast members contains actors who portray characters appearing in The Hunger Games film series based on the book series by Suzanne Collins.

Cast

References

External links
Full cast and crew for The Hunger Games at IMDb
Full cast and crew for The Hunger Games: Catching Fire at IMDb
Full cast and crew for The Hunger Games: Mockingjay - Part 1 at IMDb
Full cast and crew for The Hunger Games: Mockingjay - Part 2 at IMDb

Cast
Lists of actors by film series